In algebraic geometry, there are two slightly different definitions of an fpqc morphism, both variations of faithfully flat morphisms. 

Sometimes an fpqc morphism means one that is faithfully flat and quasicompact. This is where the abbreviation fpqc comes from: fpqc stands for the French phrase "fidèlement plat et quasi-compact", meaning "faithfully flat and quasi-compact".

However it is more common to define an fpqc morphism  of schemes to be a faithfully flat morphism that satisfies the following equivalent conditions:
 Every quasi-compact open subset of Y is the image of a quasi-compact open subset of X.
 There exists a covering  of Y by open affine subschemes such that each  is the image of a quasi-compact open subset of X.
 Each point  has a quasi-compact neighborhood such that  is open affine.

Examples: An open faithfully flat morphism is fpqc.

An fpqc morphism satisfies the following properties:
 The composite of fpqc morphisms is fpqc.
 A base change of an fpqc morphism is fpqc.
 A faithfully flat morphism that is locally of finite presentation (i.e., fppf) is fpqc.
 If  is an fpqc morphism, a subset of Y is open in Y if and only if its inverse image under f is open in X.

See also 
 Flat topology
 fppf morphism

References 

Stacks Project, "The fpqc Topology." http://stacks.math.columbia.edu/tag/03NV

Morphisms of schemes